New Kinpo Group Headquarters, is an under-construction, 55-storey skyscraper office building located in Beitou-Shilin Technology Park, Beitou District, Taipei, Taiwan. Designed by the famous Taiwanese architect Chu-Yuan Lee, the ground breaking ceremony of the building was held on 8 February 2023. The building will become the fifth tallest building in Taipei and the seventh tallest in Taiwan upon its estimated completion in Q4 of 2026. The building will serve as the new headquarters for New Kinpo Group and is expected to create over 7,000 job openings, bringing roughly NT$22.3 billion in terms of financial benefits for the Taipei City Government.

See also 
 List of tallest buildings in Taiwan
 List of tallest buildings in Taipei
 Beitou-Shilin Technology Park

References

Skyscraper office buildings in Taipei
Buildings and structures under construction in Taiwan